Ali St. Louis (May 13, 1959 – September 25, 2011) was an athlete from Trinidad and Tobago who specialized in the 200 and 400 metres.

At the 1982 Central American and Caribbean Games he won a bronze medal in the 4 × 400 m relay, and at the 1986 Central American and Caribbean Games he won a silver medal in the 4 × 400 m relay, and finished eighth in the 200 metres. He competed at the 1984 Olympics.

He competed collegiately for the Abilene Christian Wildcats, and was a high-level coach in his later life. He died in 2011 in a car crash near his home in D'Abadie.

References

1959 births
2011 deaths
Trinidad and Tobago male sprinters
Athletes (track and field) at the 1984 Summer Olympics
Olympic athletes of Trinidad and Tobago
Abilene Christian University alumni
Athletics (track and field) coaches
Road incident deaths in Trinidad and Tobago
Central American and Caribbean Games silver medalists for Trinidad and Tobago
Central American and Caribbean Games bronze medalists for Trinidad and Tobago
Competitors at the 1982 Central American and Caribbean Games
Competitors at the 1986 Central American and Caribbean Games
Central American and Caribbean Games medalists in athletics